John Vickery (1906-1983) was an Australian artist. He worked in the fields of painting, illustration and advertising. He is the only Australian artist to have been a part of the New York School.

Life and work
Vickery was born in Bunyip, Victoria in Australia in 1906. He relocated to New York, New York in the United States in 1936. He was colleagues with Philip Guston, Jackson Pollock, Joan Mitchell, and Willem de Kooning.

He died in Califon, New Jersey in 1983.

Notable collections
Halo, 1970, synthetic polymer paint on composition board; in the collection of the National Gallery of Victoria, Melbourne, Australia

References

1906 births
1983 deaths
People from Victoria (Australia)
People from Califon, New Jersey
Australian illustrators
Australian painters
Australian commercial artists
Australian emigrants to the United States